Mahakavi Puthencavu Mathan Tharakan (born 1903) was a Malayalam poet.

Birth and family
He was born on 5 September 1903 at Puthencavu, a village in present day Alapuzha district of Kerala, South India, then in Travancore to Kizhakkethalakal Eapen Mathai and Mariamma.

He had 2 sons. His son K. M. Tharakan was a chairman of the Kerala Sahitya Akademi, noted critic, writer and novelist.

Surviving descendants of Puthencavu Mathan Tharakan, his great grand nephew C. John Mathai and family, currently reside in Alleppey.

Education and career
His early life was spent in Puthencavu. He was inspired by the work of his great-uncle George Mathan to pursue a career in literature together with academic work. 
By his own efforts, he was able to pass the Malayalam Vidwan exam and also earned a Master of Arts Degree in Malayalam in 1952, he joined Catholicate College, Pathanamthitta as a lecturer. He went on to become the Head of the Department of Malayalam and was the officiating Principal from 1957-1958. He was also a member of the Kerala Sahitya Akademi from 1960-1964. In 1972, he obtained permission from the government and made a successful attempt to revive "Bhajemathaam", the political newsweekly run by M. Mathunny from Cengannur in the twenties. As a young nationalist Mathan Tharakan was associated with the paper. A dedicated Congress man, he worked closely with Elanthoor Kumarji, the veteran Gandhian and Freedom Fighter, to promote Khadi and the nationalist ideology even after independence.

Works
Mathan Tharakan earned the title of Mahakavi for his magnum opus on the life of Christ - Viswadeepam  written in 1965. As a lyricist, he penned the lyrics for 14 songs which were used in the second Malayalam movie ever made, Gnanambika in 1940.

References

1903 births
Malayalam poets
Malayali people
1993 deaths
20th-century Indian poets
Indian male poets
People from Alappuzha district
Poets from Kerala
20th-century Indian male writers
Tharakan titleholders